Hartvik or Hartvic (also Arduin, ; died after 1103) was a prelate (most probably the bishop of Győr) in the Kingdom of Hungary under King Coloman the Book-lover. He wrote a new Life of St Stephen I of Hungary based on the holy king's two earlier hagiographies.

Identification
The author of the Legenda Hartviciana called himself Cartuicus or Hartuicus episcopus, without mentioning his episcopal see. Several historians in the 19th century claimed Hartvik (or Hartvic) was of German origin, and perhaps served as bishop of Regensburg (and thus he is identical with Hartwig I of Spanheim) or Meissen (see Herwig of Meissen). Other historians considered he is identical with that Hartwig, who was abbot of Hersfeld from 1072 to 1090, and was installed as pro-imperial anti-Archbishop of Magdeburg in 1085.

Based on the fact that Arduin of Ivrea, an 11th-century claimant to the title King of Italy, was referred to as Hartvigus in contemporary German sources, historian Gyula Pauler considered that Hartvik is identical with that episcopus Ioviensis Arduin, who – alongside a certain comes Thomas – was sent by King Coloman of Hungary to the court of Roger I of Sicily in 1097 to propose marriage to Roger's daughter. Their legation is appeared in De rebus gestis Rogerii et Roberti by Benedictine historian Goffredo Malaterra. Pauler argued the episcopal see Ioviensis is a result of distortion of text and can be matched with Iaurinensis, i.e. the Diocese of Győr.

His theological proficiency is shown by the fact that he used the 9th-century Pseudo-Isidore decretals in his work. A late 11th-century pontifical liturgical book (Agenda Pontificalis), kept in Zagreb, was compiled for a certain bishop Chartuirgus. Church historian Károly Kniewald identified this person with Hartvik, the bishop of Győr, based on the listed churches and procession routes. The pontifical was compiled before 1100. A now lost royal charter of Coloman issued in 1103, recorded by 18th-century historian Miklós Schmitth, mentioned Bishop Arduin of Győr among the witnesses. His successor, George is first mentioned as bishop in 1111, implying that Hartvik died by then.

Legenda Hartviciana

Upon the order of Coloman, Hartvik composed the hagiography of Saint Stephen, the first king of Hungary – called Legenda Hartviciana or Vita Hartviciana, which was based on two existing legends (Legenda maior and Legenda minor). Historian Gábor Thoroczkay argued Hartvik compiled his work in the period between 1097 and 1099, or the early 1100s at the latest, while other historians – e.g. Zoltán Tóth, József Gerics – considered the bishop wrote the legend in the 1110s. Beside the veneration of Stephen I, Hartvik's legend served justified the political purposes of Coloman in order to defend his royal prerogative to appoint the prelates of his realm, as a response to the Gregorian Reform and the Investiture Controversy. With some modifications in the text, Pope Innocent III sanctioned the Legenda Hartviciana as the official hagiography of Stephen I of Hungary in 1201.

References

Sources

 
 
 
 

11th-century Roman Catholic bishops in Hungary
12th-century Roman Catholic bishops in Hungary
11th-century Hungarian people
12th-century Hungarian people
Bishops of Győr
Christian hagiographers
Medieval Hungarian writers
12th-century Latin writers